Ali Khadivar (born 11 November 1989) is an Iranian sprinter. He won an individual bronze medal at the 2017 Islamic Solidarity Games in the 400 m, and holds a national record in this event.

References

Iranian male sprinters
1989 births
Living people
Athletes (track and field) at the 2018 Asian Games
Asian Games competitors for Iran
Islamic Solidarity Games competitors for Iran
Islamic Solidarity Games medalists in athletics
21st-century Iranian people